Balangu may refer to:

Places

Balangan-e Olya, a village in Rostam-e Do Rural District, Iran

Other uses
 Balangu, a meat dish of Nigeria
 Balangu, vernacular name for several plants of the mint family and their seeds:
 Lallemantia iberica, known in Iran as balangu shahri
 Lallemantia royleana, known in Iran as balangu shirazi